Kargala (Qarğalı) is a rural locality (a village) in Surensky Selsoviet, Zianchurinsky District, Bashkortostan, Russia. The population was 186 as of 2010. There are 3 streets.

Geography 
Kargala is located 47 km east of Isyangulovo (the district's administrative centre) by road. Verkhnyaya Kazarma is the nearest rural locality.

References 

Rural localities in Zianchurinsky District